A municipality in Nepal is an administrative division in the Provinces of Nepal. The urban population of Nepal refers to the inhabitants residing in the designated municipal area. Population size has been taken as the principal criteria in the declaration of urban areas in Nepal since 1961. Municipalities can therefore also include rural areas. It functions as a sub-unit of a district. Nepal currently has 293 municipalities, which given the 2011 population estimate of 16,656,057.

The municipalities are categorised into three categories: Metropolitan municipality (500,000+ population), Sub-metropolitan municipality (200,000+ population) and Municipality (10,000+ population). There are 6 metropolitan municipality, 11 sub-metropolitan municipality and 276 municipality.

History

The first urban center in Nepal took place in Kathmandu Valley. The historical evidences on the existence of towns in the Kathmandu Valley are found during Licchavi period. At the same time, three major towns with urban characteristics had been developed in the Kathmandu Valley. During the Rana period, towns in the hills were also as hill stations for the purpose of administration and as an outpost against invaders. Towns like Dhankuta in East Nepal, Palpa in Central Nepal and Doti in West Nepal were initially developed as cantonments. Urban areas in the Terai developed because of trade between Nepal and British India. The British had laid railway lines at the border of Nepal for the purpose of trade which gradually increased urban centers in the Terai. Although urban areas developed during Rana period or before it were not officially recorded. Kathmandu was given the status of municipality in 1930 but was only gazetted in 1953. Dharan was established in 1958 as a fourth municipality of the country

Structure and responsibilities 
As defined by Part 17 of the Constitution of Nepal, the municipalities are governed by a Municipal Executive headed by a mayor. The Municipal Executive consists of the deputy mayor, ward chairpersons elected from each ward in the municipality, and five women members elected by the Municipal Assembly among themselves and three members from the Dalit or other minority communities. Part 18 of the Constitution of Nepal states that the Municipal Assembly hold all legislative powers of the municipality. It consists of the mayor, deputy mayor, ward chairpersons and four ward members elected from each of the wards in the municipality out of which at least two must be a woman. One member of the Dalit of minority communities that was elected to the Municipal Executive is also a member of the Assembly Part 17 also includes provisions for a Judicial Committee which is headed by the deputy mayor and consists of two other members elected by the Municipal Assembly among themselves. Schedule 8 and Schedule 9 of the constitution deals with powers that the local executive can execute either on its own or concurrently with the federal and the provincial governments.

Classification

Metropolitan Municipality 
According to the Local Government Operation Act 2017 a metropolitan municipality must have following criteria to get the status of Metropolitan Municipality:

 Population: 500,000+
 Annual Income (in NPR): 1,00,00,00,000+
 Infrastructures: Educational institute up to the higher level, medical services, hospitals, transportation facilities, metalled road, communication services, Museum, stadium, assembly hall and exhibition area of international standard. Sufficient recreation places for children and elderly people, Basic water supply and sanitation services. Garbage treatment and management system, Shopping mall, vegetable and fruit market, hotels of international standards. Urban greenery and scenic beauty, etc. as prescribed by government.

Sub-metropolitan Municipality
A sub-metropolitan municipality must have to fulfill following criteria:

 Population: 200,000+
 Annual Income (in NPR): 25,000,000+
 Infrastructures: higher-level education, medical services, hospitals, transportation facilities, metalled road, basic communication services, Public garden, assembly hall, stadium, gym hall and covered hall of national standard, Basic water supply and sanitation services. Garbage treatment and management system, Market place, animal slaughter houses, human corpses disposal place. Hotel, motel and resorts of tourism standards. Disable friendly and physically accessible infrastructures.

List of Municipalities by the date of establishment

1953 to 1997
There were 58 traditional municipalities which established from 1953 to 1997. (Below given population are prior to reconstruction in 2017. In 2017 more area and population added to given municipality)

2014
Total 133 municipalities were established in 2014 in two segments but on 10 March 2017 reconstructed local level body and brought changing in some of municipalities. Some municipality completely disestablished (declined)

72 municipalities were established in 18 May 2014 

61 new Municipalities were established on 2 December 2014.

2015
Total 26 municipalities were established on 19 September 2015. Reconstructed on 10 March 2017 with some changing in existed municipalities.

2017
On 10 March 2017 Government of Nepal reconstructed old local level bodies into 744 new local level units as per the new constitution of Nepal 2015. Later, on recommendance of Supreme court 9 more local level body added to Province No. 2, increasing from 744 to 753.

See also
List of cities in Nepal
List of rural municipalities of Nepal

References

Municipalities of Nepal